The boys' individual skills challenge at the 2016 Winter Youth Olympics was held between February 13–18, 2016 at Kristins Hall in Lillehammer, Norway.

Entry List/Seedings

Qualification
Participants received 1 point for completing the 1st round, 2 points for completing the quarter-final, 3 points for completing the semi-final, 4 points for completing the final, and 5 points for winning the final. They are then ranked in most events according to best time; in Shooting Accuracy and Passing Precision they are ranked by most targets hit (T) in fewest attempts (A) then in the best time; and in Fastest Shot by highest speed.

The players are ranked (Rk) by total points (Pt). If still tied, by number of better skill rankings (number of ranks 1; if the same, number of ranks 2; if the same, number of ranks 3, etc.). If still tied, by overall seeding for the phase.

The eight highest ranked will qualify (Q) to the Grand Final with the ninth and tenth ranked on reserve (R) for the Grand Final.

Grand final

References

Boys' individual skills challenge